The sixth Connecticut House of Representatives district elects one member of the Connecticut House of Representatives. Its current representative is Edwin Vargas. The district consists of the southwest and south-central parts of the city of Hartford, including the South End neighborhood. The district is one of few in Connecticut to have a Hispanic plurality population, but also has the largest population of white residents of any Hartford district.

List of representatives

Recent elections

External links 
 Google Maps - Connecticut House Districts

References

06
Hartford, Connecticut